A supercentenarian (sometimes hyphenated as super-centenarian) is a person who has reached the age of 110 years. This age is achieved by about one in 1,000 centenarians. Supercentenarians typically live a life free of major age-related diseases until shortly before the maximum human lifespan is reached.

Etymology
The term "Supercentenarian", originally hyphenated as Super-centenarian, has existed since 1870.

The terminology "Ultracentenarian", has also been used to describe someone over 100 years.

Norris McWhirter, editor of Guinness World Records, used the term in association with age claim's researcher A. Ross Eckler Jr. in 1976, and the term was further popularised in 1991 by William Strauss and Neil Howe in their book Generations.

The term "semisupercentenarian", has been used to describe someone from 105-109. Originally the term "supercentenarian" was used to mean someone well over the age of 100, but 110 years and over became the cutoff point of accepted criteria for demographers.

Incidence

The Gerontology Research Group maintains a top 30–40 list of oldest verified living people. The researchers estimate, based on a 0.15% to 0.25% survival rate of centenarians until the age of 110, that there should be between 300 and 450 living supercentenarians in the world. A study conducted in 2010 by the Max Planck Institute for Demographic Research found 663 validated supercentenarians, living and dead, and showed that the countries with the highest total number (not frequency) of supercentenarians (in decreasing order) were the United States, Japan, England plus Wales, France, and Italy. The first verified supercentenarian in human history was Dutchman Geert Adriaans Boomgaard (1788–1899), and it was not until the 1980s that the oldest verified age surpassed 115.

History

While claims of extreme age have persisted from the earliest times in history, the earliest supercentenarian accepted by Guinness World Records is Dutchman Thomas Peters (reportedly 1745–1857).. Other scholars, such as French demographer Jean-Marie Robine, consider Geert Adriaans Boomgaard, also of the Netherlands, who turned 110 in 1898, to be the first verifiable case, as the alleged evidence for Peters has apparently been lost. The evidence for the 112 years of Englishman William Hiseland (reportedly 1620–1732) does not meet the standards required by Guinness World Records..

Church of Norway records, the accuracy of which is subject to dispute, also show what appear to be several supercentenarians who lived in the south-central part of present-day Norway during the 16th and 17th centuries, including Johannes Torpe (1549–1664), and Knud Erlandson Etun (1659–1770), both residents of Valdres, Oppland. 

In 1902, Margaret Ann Neve, born in 1792, became the first verified female supercentenarian. 

Jeanne Calment of France, who died in 1997 aged 122 years, 164 days, had the longest human lifespan documented. The oldest man ever verified is Jiroemon Kimura of Japan, who died in 2013 aged 116 years and 54 days. 

Maria Branyas (born 4 March 1907) of Spain is the world's oldest living person, aged . Juan Vicente Pérez (born 27 May 1909) is the world's oldest living man, aged .

Research into centenarians

Research into centenarians helps scientists understand how an ordinary person might live longer.

Organisations that research centenarians and supercentenarians include the GRG and the Supercentenarian Research Foundation.

In May 2021, whole-genome sequencing analysis of 81 Italian semi-supercentenarians and supercentenarians were published, along with 36 control group people from the same region who were simply of advanced age.

Morbidity
Research on the morbidity of supercentenarians has found that they remain free of major age-related diseases (e.g., stroke, cardiovascular disease, dementia, cancer, Parkinson's disease, and diabetes) until the very end of life when they die of exhaustion of organ reserve, which is the ability to return organ function to homeostasis. About 10% of supercentenarians survive until the last three months of life without major age-related diseases, as compared to only 4% of semi-supercentenarians and 3% of centenarians.

By measuring the biological age of various tissues from supercentenarians, researchers may be able to identify the nature of those that are protected from ageing effects. According to a study of 30 different body parts from a 112-year-old female supercentenarian, along with younger controls, the cerebellum is protected from ageing, according to an epigenetic biomarker of tissue age known as the epigenetic clock—the reading is about 15 years younger than expected in a centenarian. These findings could explain why the cerebellum exhibits fewer neuropathological hallmarks of age-related dementia as compared to other brain regions.

A 2021 genomic study identified genetic characteristics that protect against age-related diseases, particularly variants that improve DNA repair. Five variants were found to be significant, affecting STK17A (increased expression) and COA1 (reduced expression) genes. Supercentenarians also had an unexpectedly low level of somatic mutations.

See also
 List of supercentenarians

References

External links

Gerontology Research Group
International Database on Longevity
Supercentenarian Research Foundation
New England Supercentenarian Study
European Supercentenarian Organisation

 
Senescence